David Bobin (1945 – 24 May 2017) was an English sports journalist mainly known for his work on television.

Bobin began his career as a newspaper journalist in Oxford during the 1960s before graduating to television with Southern Television in 1975. He continued to appear on ITV with Southern's successor franchises Television South and Meridian Broadcasting. Bobin also served as anchor on the former's news programme Coast to Coast.

He left terrestrial television in 1993 when he joined Sky Sports where he has fronted their coverage of Spain's La Liga as well as appearing regularly as a presenter on Sky Sports News.

Bobin's son is British film director, writer, and producer James Bobin, who is best known for directing 2011 film The Muppets.

Bobin's death was first reported on the Twitter account of Sky Sports colleague Simon Thomas on  26 May 2017 and was subsequently reported by several news outlets.

References

1945 births
2017 deaths
English sports broadcasters
Sky Sports presenters and reporters